Johnny Cash Is Coming to Town is the 73rd album by American country singer Johnny Cash, released in 1987, and his first for Mercury Records. It was re-released in 2003, paired with Boom Chicka Boom on a single CD. "Sixteen Tons" was previously a hit for Tennessee Ernie Ford, "The Big Light" is an Elvis Costello song from his album King of America, released the previous year and "Let Him Roll" is from Guy Clark's debut, Old No. 1. The album reached #36 on the country charts, while the only released single, "The Night Hank Williams Came to Town", peaked at #43.

"Ballad of Barbara" is a rerecording of a track that had been a hit single for Cash in the early 1970s. A number of tracks left over from the album's recording sessions would later surface on Cash's final Mercury album, The Mystery of Life, released in 1991.

Track listing

Personnel
Johnny Cash - vocals, guitar
Waylon Jennings - vocals on "The Night Hank Williams Came to Town"
Jim Soldi - lead and acoustic guitar, backing vocals
Marty Stuart - lead and acoustic guitar, mandolin, backing vocals
Pete Wade - lead guitar
Bob Wootton - lead guitar
Joey Miskulin - lead guitar, acoustic bass, backing vocals, keyboards
Jack Clement - acoustic guitar, dobro, Jews harp, kazoo
Mike Elliot - acoustic guitar
Jimmy Tittle - electric bass, backing vocals
Joe Allen, Michael Rhodes - electric bass
Roy Huskey, Jr. - acoustic bass
W.S. "Fluke" Holland - drums
Kenny Malone - percussion
Jack Hale, Jr. - horns, keyboards
Bob Lewin - horns, keyboards
Jay Patten - horns
Earl Poole Ball - piano
Charles Cochrane - piano, keyboards
Lloyd Green - steel guitar
Stuart Duncan, Mark O'Connor, Vassar Clements - fiddle
Paco - harmonica
June Carter and The Carter Family (June Carter Cash, Helen Carter, Anita Carter, Carlene Carter), Cinday Cash-Stuart, Bernard Peyton - backing vocals
Charlie Williams - announcer voice on "The Night Hank Williams Came to Town"

Additional personnel
Produced by Jack Clement
Assistant producer: David Ferguson
Recorded at the Cowboy Arms Hotel and Recording Spa
Engineers: Rich Adler (chief engineer and technical director), David Ferguson
Mixing engineers: Dave Ferguson (all except "Heavy Metal...") and Rich Adler ("Heavy Metal...")
Executive producer: Joey Miskulin
Mastering: Glenn Meadows, Masterfonics
Production manager: Coley Coleman
Liner notes: John Lomax III
Eyes courtesy: Dr. Marie Kelly, Dr. Burkett Nelson
Photography: Slick Lawson
Art design: Virginia Team
Design: Jerry Joyner, Joe Rogers

Charts
Album - Billboard (United States)

Singles - Billboard (United States)

References

External links
Luma Electronic's Johnny Cash discography listing

Is Coming to Town, Johnny Cash
1987 albums
Albums produced by Jack Clement
Mercury Nashville albums

es:Classic Cash: Hall of Fame Series